The Palace Theater is a movie theatre in downtown Hilo, Hawai'i in the United States of America. Built in 1925, the theater is one of the more prominent public buildings constructed in Hilo in the early 20th century. Architects Davis & Fishbourne designed the theater in the Beaux-Arts style. The two-story building has five bays on its front facade; a metal marquee divides the two stories. The three central bays feature broken pediments and decorative urns above the second-floor windows. A parapet with a balustrade runs along the top of the building. After the original theater closed, the Palace reopened in 1998 as an arthouse.

The theater was added to the National Register of Historic Places on May 11, 1993.

The Palace Theater features a restored lobby with a cafe serving refreshments during movie showings, concerts and theatrical performances. The theater itself features steeply banked amphitheater seating in three tiers, and a wonderful decorative proscenium frames the stage. 

A large Robert Morton pipe organ is in the auditorium. Much of it is original to the Palace in 1925, but the organ was moved to the Hilo Theatre in 1940, which was destroyed by the 1960 tsunami. The surviving pipework was then purchased by Roger Angell and installed in his family home in Honolulu. He eventually donated the organ back to the Palace, and it has been expanded with portions of the pipe organ from the demolished Waikiki Theatre in Honolulu.

The Palace is a favorite venue for performers and bands, with concerts regularly scheduled. Every Spring a local variety show fund-raiser features local talent, and each Fall a full theatrical musical production is staged for serial performances over the course of a month. Independent films are a consistent draw. Special events are staged as well, allowing the public to see and use the theater for many events outside of the typical use as a movie theater.

See also
Hawaii International Film Festival

References

External links 

Official site

1925 establishments in Hawaii
Cinemas and movie theaters in Hawaii
Theatres in Hawaii
Theatres on the National Register of Historic Places in Hawaii
Buildings and structures in Hilo, Hawaii
Neoclassical architecture in Hawaii
National Register of Historic Places in Hawaii County, Hawaii
Public venues with a theatre organ
Theatres completed in 1925